The 2017–18 Liga Națională season was the 68th season of the Liga Națională, the highest professional basketball league in Romania. U-BT Cluj-Napoca were the defending champion.

Competition format
The competition format will be the same as in the previous season.

 12 teams played the regular season, consisting in a double-legged round robin format.
 At the end of the regular season, teams are split into two groups, one of them composed by the first six teams and the other one by the rest. In this second stage all points of the regular season are counted and the teams will face each other from its group twice.
 All teams from the group from 1st to 6th and the two first qualified teams from the bottom group will join the playoffs. In this knockout stage, quarterfinals and semifinals will be played with a best-of-three-games format and the final with a best-of-five one.

Teams
Timba Timișoara and Politehnica Iași promoted from the last Liga I. There were not any relegations as there were only 11 teams in the previous season and Olimpic Baia Mare withdrew from the competition.

Regular season

Second stage

Group 1–6

Group 7–12

Play-offs
All series were played in a best-of-five games format.

References

External links
Official site of the Romanian Basketball Federation
Halfcourt.info (Romanian and English)
Numaibaschet.ro (Romanian)
Baschetromania.ro (Romanian)

2017-18
Romanian
Lea